The 1916 Tasmanian state election was held on 23 March 1916.

Retiring Members

Labor
Vincent Barker MHA (Denison)
Lyndhurst Giblin MHA (Denison)

Liberal
Daniel Ryan MHA (Franklin)

House of Assembly
Sitting members are shown in bold text. Tickets that elected at least one MHA are highlighted in the relevant colour. Successful candidates are indicated by an asterisk (*).

Bass
Six seats were up for election. The Labor Party was defending three seats. The Liberal Party was defending three seats.

Darwin
Six seats were up for election. The Labor Party was defending three seats. The Liberal Party was defending three seats, although Joshua Whitsitt was running as an independent.

Denison
Six seats were up for election. The Labor Party was defending four seats. The Liberal Party was defending two seats.

Franklin
Six seats were up for election. The Labor Party was defending three seats. The Liberal Party was defending three seats.

Wilmot
Six seats were up for election. The Labor Party was defending two seats. The Liberal Party was defending four seats.

See also
 Members of the Tasmanian House of Assembly, 1913–1916
 Members of the Tasmanian House of Assembly, 1916–1919

References
Tasmanian Parliamentary Library

Candidates for Tasmanian state elections